The Austin Lone Stars were a soccer club that competed in the SISL, USISL and United Soccer Leagues from 1987 to 2000. The club originally started in 1987/88 as the Austin Sockadillos in the original indoor SISL league. They became the Austin Lone Stars in 1994.

History
In 1987, Fernando Marcos established the Austin Sockadillos.  Coached by Tony Simoes and assisted by Wolfgang Suhnholz, the team played in the Southwest Indoor Soccer League (SISL).  During the 1988-1989 season, they played their home games at Tatu's All Star Indoor Soccer Place.  The league ran two outdoor seasons, but in 1989, introduced a summer outdoor season as well.  During the 1989 outdoor season, the league was known as the Southwest Outdoor Soccer League and the team was known as the Capital Sockadillos.  It played its home games at a variety of venues including Burger Center, Nelson Field, and House Park.  During the 1989 indoor season, the Sockadillos finished runner up to the Lubbock Lazers, but garnered multiple post-season honors, including MPV and league leading scorer (71 goals) Brian Monaghan, assist leader Uwe Balzis and Coach of the Year Tony Simoes.  This year, Saeed Kadkhodaian also became team owner and Suhnholz replaced Simoes as head coach.  Kadkhodaian had played for the team in its first few seasons.  He had also held several positions in the team management.  In 1990 Kadkhodaian leased the club to the Austin Capital Soccer Club.  In March 1994, the team was renamed the Lone Stars and Suhnholz returned as head coach.  By this time, the team was co-owned by Kadkhodaian and Rick Schram.  In February 1997, the Lone Stars became a fully professional team.

Year-by-year

Head coach
 Tony Simoes
 George Ley
 Wolfgang Suhnholz 1997-1998
John Fitsimons 1999-2000

Honors
MVP
 Brian Monaghan (1989)
 Gabe Jones (1995)

Leading scorer
 Brian Monaghan (1989)
 Gabe Jones (1995)

Rookie of the Year
 Steve Bailey (1987-1988)

Coach of the Year
 Tony Simoes

References

Sports in Austin, Texas
Defunct soccer clubs in Texas
USL Second Division teams
Association football clubs established in 1987
Association football clubs disestablished in 2000
1987 establishments in Texas
2000 disestablishments in Texas
Lone Stars